The Book of David: Vol.1 – The Transition is the fifth studio album by American singer Dave Hollister. It was released by GospoCentric Records and the Zomba Label Group on September 26, 2006, in the United States.

Critical reception

Allmusic editor Andy Kellman felt that the album "really isn't that much different from the singer's past releases. Hollister has a newfound focus, and the subject matter often takes on a slightly more pronounced turn for the spiritual, but the tracks bump and sway as much as any other set he has released. Besides, the detectable changes shouldn't shock anyone who has followed him – he came up in the church, and both of his parents were preachers. The album lacks the beneficial brevity of 2003's Real Talk and meanders during the second half. Beyond that, it is just as appealing as anything else in the man's catalog and should not be disregarded by virtue of its label of release."

Track listing

Notes
  denotes co-producer

Charts

References

2006 albums
Albums produced by Dave Hollister
Dave Hollister albums